Gaidar Malikovich Gadzhiyev (5 August 1953 – 1 December 2001) was a Russian major general of the Strategic Missile Troops. 

Gadzhiyev, had been a deputy military commandant for Russia since 1998, and was in charge of the Urus-Martanovsky District in Chechnya when he was killed in suicide attack by a young local woman, Aiza Gazuyeva. On 29 November 2001, in what is believed to be revenge for her witnessing him personally killing her husband, Aiza Gazuyeva entered Gadzhiyev's office and detonated a bundle of hand grenades. The blast killed Gazuyeva and two of Gadzhiyev's bodyguards instantly, while Gadzhiyev himself initially survived with serious injuries until he died a few days later on 1 December. Despite the attack being personally motivated and not political, the attack was one of the first notable shahidka (Chechen female suicide bomber) attacks to occur in Russia.

Gadzhiyev was awarded the Order of Courage in 2001, and posthumously the title of Hero of the Russian Federation "for courage and heroism in the counter-terrorist operation in the North Caucasus" in 2002.

References

1953 births
2001 deaths
People from Khunzakhsky District
Avar people
Russian major generals
People of the Chechen wars
Heroes of the Russian Federation
Assassinated Russian people